Dans l'enfer des tournantes (In the Hell of the Tournantes) is a book by French activist Samira Bellil.

The book focuses on life in the banlieues, where Bellil says that she and countless other young girls have been victims of organized gang-rapes known as tournantes.  Banlieue literally translates as "suburb", but in the context of modern France, refers to the poorer housing estates, often populated by immigrants and their children, that ring the big cities. The book was first published on October 9, 2002.

References

Current affairs books
2002 non-fiction books
French memoirs
Rape in France
Gang rape in Europe